In their 52-year history, the Milwaukee Bucks have selected the following players in the National Basketball Association draft.

Notes

References

 

 
National Basketball Association draft
Draft history